Saint-Christol (Provençal: Sant Cristòu) is a former commune in the Hérault department in the Occitanie region in southern France. On 1 January 2019, it was merged into the new commune Entre-Vignes.

Population

See also
Communes of the Hérault department

References

Former communes of Hérault